Pizzo di Brünesc (also known as Pizzo di Brunescio) is a mountain of the Lepontine Alps, overlooking Cavergno, in the canton of Ticino. It lies at the southern end of the chain between the Val Bavona and Valle di Peccia.

References

External links
 Pizzo di Brünesc on Hikr

Mountains of the Alps
Mountains of Switzerland
Mountains of Ticino
Lepontine Alps